The men's 10,000 metres at the 2002 European Athletics Championships were held at the Olympic Stadium on August 7.

Results

External links

10000
10,000 metres at the European Athletics Championships
Marathons in Germany